Bahurani or Daughter-in-Law is a Bollywood film. It was released in 1940. The film was directed by R.S. Junnarkar and Mubarak for Kishore Sahu Productions. It starred Kishore Sahu, Rose, Anuradha, Mubarak, Madhurika, and Nana Palsikar. The music of the film was composed by Rafiqe Ghaznavi.

References

External links
 

1940 films
1940s Hindi-language films
Indian black-and-white films